Tangkeng station may refer to:

 Tangkeng station (Guangzhou Metro), a station on the Guangzhou Metro in Guangzhou, Guangdong.
 Tangkeng station (Shenzhen Metro), a station on the Shenzhen Metro in Shenzhen, Guangdong.